Ryan Wallace may refer to:

 Ryan Wallace (artist) (born 1977), multi-media artist
 Ryan Wallace (footballer) (born 1990), Scottish footballer